Antoine Frankowski (9 March 1926 – 21 August 1993) was a French racing cyclist. He rode in the 1950 Tour de France.

References

1926 births
1993 deaths
French male cyclists
Place of birth missing